Albysjön is the name of several Swedish lakes:
 Albysjön, Botkyrka between Botkyrka and Huddinge
 Albysjön, Tyresö in Tyresö